Gunter Vanderveeren (born 5 April 1970) is a Belgian former professional tennis player.

Vanderveeren, who reached a best singles world ranking of 358, featured in the main draw of the 1988 Brussels Indoor and in qualifying for the 1995 Wimbledon Championships.

From 2007 to 2009 he coached Belgian player Kristof Vliegen.

References

External links
 
 

1970 births
Living people
Belgian male tennis players
Belgian tennis coaches